Tetrastichus is a genus of hymenopteran insects of the family Eulophidae.

Tetrastichus planipennisi is a parasitoid of the emerald ash borer, a wood boring insect native to Asia which is an invasive species in North America. T. planipennisi is being evaluated as a biological control agent.

Host species 
The genus Tetrastichus parasitizes many different species of Lepidoptera, such as Pyralis farinalis.

References

Key to Nearctic eulophid genera
Universal Chalcidoidea Database

Eulophidae